The Association for Somogy (Hungarian: Somogyért, officially: Somogyért Egyesület) is a local political party in the county of Somogy in Hungary, allied with the Hungarian Socialist Party. At the legislative elections, April 9 and 23, 2006, the party won 1 constituency seat.

It was founded on May 25, 1994 by 109 politicians and entrepreneurs in Somogy. It is currently led by István Gyenesei, engineer and economist, former chairman of the Somogy County General Assembly. Since the 2006 legislative elections, he had been a non-partisan member of the Hungarian Parliament.

References

Website
 Somogyért

1994 establishments in Hungary
Political parties in Hungary
Regionalist parties
Regionalist parties in Hungary
Somogy County
History of Somogy